Dato’ Seri Dr. Burhanuddin bin Muhammad Nur al-Hilmi (Jawi: برهان الدين بن محمد نور الحلمي; 29 August 1911 – 25 October 1969), commonly known as Burhanuddin al-Helmy, was a Malaysian politician. He was President of the Malaysian Islamic Party (PAS) from 1956 to his death in October 1969.

Early and personal life

Burhanuddin was born in Kota Bharu, Perak in 1911. His father, Muhammad Nur came from Batu Sangkar, West Sumatra, Indonesia and he studied at India's Aligarh Muslim University. After his return from India, he taught Arabic at Madrasah Aljunied Al-Islamiah, Aljunied, Singapore. During his time in Singapore, he was arrested by the British, but was bailed out after one night by a member of the Alsagoff family.

Post-war activism
After World War II, Burhanuddin set up the Malay Nationalist Party. The party advocated Malay rights and proposed a "political union" with Indonesia.

PAS Presidency
Burhanuddin assumed the presidency of PAS in 1956, and held the post until his death in 1969. He won the Besut parliamentary seat in the 1959 elections. PAS had a left-wing orientation under Burhanuddin's leadership: he supported trade unions and anti-colonialism. He has been described as a "radical nationalist and Islamic thinker". His presidency was interrupted by his arrest under the Internal Security Act in 1965 and subsequent imprisonment for one year on charges of plotting to overthrow the Malaysian government and install an Indonesian-friendly replacement.

Legacy

Awards
 :
 Knight Grand Commander of the Order of the Perak State Crown (SPMP) – Dato' Seri (2015)

Places named after him
Several places were named after him, including:
 Jalan Burhanuddin Helmi in Taman Tun Dr Ismail, Kuala Lumpur
 Persiaran Burhanuddin Helmi in Taman Tun Dr Ismail, Kuala Lumpur
 Sekolah Menengah Kebangsaan Doktor Burhanuddin in Taiping, Perak
 Sekolah Rendah Islam Burhanuddin Al-Helmy in Alor Setar, Kedah
 Kolej Burhanuddin Helmi, one of the residential college in National University of Malaysia, Bangi, Selangor

References

1911 births
Presidents of Malaysian Islamic Party
Malaysian people of Malay descent
1969 deaths
Prisoners and detainees of Malaysia
Malaysian people of Arab descent
Malaysian people of Minangkabau descent
People from Perak
Members of the Dewan Rakyat
Malaysian political party founders
Malaysian Leaders of the Opposition
Muslim socialists